PAOK Handball Club is the handball section of PAOK, the major multi-sports club based in Thessaloniki, Greece. PAOK has both men's and women's team. So far, men's team has won 3 Greek Championships and 3 Greek Cups and women's team has won 5 Greek Championships and 6 Greek Cups. Despite its relatively short history, it is considered amongst the most successful departments of the club.

History

PAOK Handball Club was founded in 1999 after it merged with another club from Thessaloniki, Triton. Stelios Seikeridis, former club's coach, has connected his name with the whole club's history.

PAOK promoted to A1 Ethniki for first time at the season 2000–01. Three years later, they relegated to A2 Ethniki, but they promoted back to the top-tier level the next season.

As the years passed, the team became stronger and stronger and they won two consecutive Greek Handball Championships in 2009 and 2010. At the end of the 2008–09 season PAOK defeated Panellinios in the last game of the play-offs and in 2009–10 PAOK defeated Doukas, also in the last game.

At the season 2009–10, PAOK became the second Greek team after Filippos Veria, who reach the groups of EHF Champions League.

In 2011, even though PAOK had the advantage and needed only a draw in the last game in Thessaloniki, they lost the championship to AEK.

In 2012 PAOK won the Greek Cup by beating AEK with 25–24 score in Patras. The next year, they lost with 27–23 score by AEK at the Cup final in Kerkyra.

In 2015 PAOK beats AEK again with 27–29 score at P.A.O.K. Sports Arena in Thessaloniki and won the Greek Cup. PAOK also won the Greek Championship the same year making it a double for the first time. They faced Diomidis at the play-off finals.

In 2017 PAOK beats Panellinios with 25–23 score in Kozani winning the Greek Cup for the third time.

Kits

Recent seasons

Current squad

Players

Squad for the 2022–23 season

Goalkeepers
1  Viktor Gigov
 12  Giorgos Velissariou
 16  Milos Mojsilov
Wingers
LW
 6  Alexandros Dougias
 10  Nikolaos Nikolaidis (c)
 36  Miltos Papagiotas
RW
20  Nikolaos Marinos
26  Vasilis Kavousanakis
77  Nikolaos Tzortzinis
Line players
 8  Tasos Tsamouridis
 14  Alexandros Apostolou
 19  Chrysanthos Tsanaxidis
 80  Alexandros Giavasidis

Back players
LB  
 30  Dimitris Triantafyllidis
 44  Antonis Ladakis
CB
 7  Giorgos Eleftheriaidis
 15  Tasos Triantafyllidis
 21  Nikolaos Koukmisis
RB
 5  Dionisis Karagiozopoulos
 11  Athanasios Papazoglou
 25  Antonis Emmanouil

Administration and technical staff

Honours 
 Greek Championship:
 Winners (3): 2009, 2010, 2015
 Runner-up (2): 2011, 2021
 Greek Cup:
 Winners (3): 2012, 2015, 2017
 Runner-up (2): 2013, 2021
 Double
 Winners (1): 2015

Greek Cup Finals

European record

European Distinctions
PAOK has been competing since 2006–2007 in European competitions, and has taken part in all EHF competitions up to the 2013–2014 season. PAOK returned to the European competition by taking part in the 2017–18 EHF Challenge Cup. In 2009–2010 season the team reached at the group phase of the EHF Champions League, which is its biggest achievement up to date.

Women's Department

PAOK's women handball club is also competing in the first Greek division.

On season 2012–13 they beat Ormi Patras in playoff finals with 2–1 series and won the Greek Women's Handball Championship. In the 2013–14 season, PAOK won its first cup, beating Anagennisi Arta in the final with score 22–20.

Recent seasons

Current squad

Administration and technical staff

Honours 
 Greek Championship
 Winners (5): 2013, 2019, 2020, 2021, 2022
 Runner-up (3): 2016, 2017, 2018
 Greek Cup
 Winners (6): 2014, 2016, 2019, 2020, 2021, 2022
 Runner-up (2): 2015, 2018
 Double
 Winners (4): 2019, 2020, 2021, 2022

Greek Cup Finals

Women's European record

Arenas

The home ground which PAOK use for the regular season games of the domestic league is Mikra Indoor Arena III, which holds 1,380 seats. In previous years, the team had also used Mikra Indoor Arena II, which holds 650 seats, Neapoli Indoor Hall, which holds 800 seats, and Evosmos Sports Hall, which holds 2,000 seats. Additionally, PAOK often use PAOK Sports Arena, which holds 8,500 seats, for European competitions and for the play-offs of the domestic league.

References

External links 
 
 official website women
 EHF PAOK page
 official facebook page

Greek handball clubs
PAOK